Rien R. Morris (died 2015 or 2016) was a Marshallese politician and government minister.  As of 2015 he was Minister of Justice and represented Jaluit Atoll in the Nitijela. In 2013 he was  Minister of Transport and Communications.

References

Communication ministers of the Marshall Islands
Justice ministers of the Marshall Islands
Transport ministers of the Marshall Islands 
Marshallese politicians
2010s deaths
Year of birth missing